Le Controis-en-Sologne (literally Le Controis in Sologne) is a commune in the French department Loir-et-Cher, administrative region of Centre-Val de Loire. It was established on 1 January 2019 by merger of the former communes of Contres (the seat), Feings, Fougères-sur-Bièvre, Ouchamps and Thenay.

Population

See also
Communes of the Loir-et-Cher department

References

Communes of Loir-et-Cher